John-Christophe Kloblavi Ayina (born 9 April 1991) is a French professional footballer who plays as a forward for Championnat National 2 club Thonon Evian.

Career
Ayina made his professional debuts in 2009 with Guingamp's reserve team. Shortly after, he joined Paris Saint-Germain. In July 2011, he was released.

In October 2011, Ayina began training with Quevilly, but only could be registered in January of the following year. On 20 March 2012, he scored twice against Marseille, taking the club to the semifinals of Coupe de France.

On 9 July 2012, Ayina signed a contract with Segunda División club Córdoba. On 21 August, he made his league debut, coming off the bench to replace Fuentes in the final minutes of a 0–0 away draw against Real Murcia.

On 4 January 2013 Ayina was loaned to Écija Balompié in the Segunda División B, until June. On 2 September he rescinded his link with the Andalusians, and moved to Racing Santander in the same division.

Ayina appeared in 17 matches during the campaign (only six starts, however) as the Cantabrians returned to the second level at first attempt. On 28 August 2014 he signed for Getafe, being assigned to the reserves also in the third division.

On 6 November 2015, after being sparingly used by his previous club, Ayina signed for EFL League One club Rochdale. He was released on 8 January of the following year, after only one appearance in the Football League Trophy.

On 21 January 2016, Ayina signed for EFL League Two club Newport County. He made his Newport debut as a second-half substitute versus Dagenham & Redbridge on 23 January 2016, scoring the first goal in the 2-2 draw. He was offered a new contract by Newport at the end of the 2015-16 season but the offer was withdrawn and he was released after he failed to accept the contract by the deadline of 10 June 2016.

In January 2017 he moved to Italy by signing for Virtus Francavilla. In January 2018 he was signed by Bisceglie. After spells at Fidelis Andria, Savoia and Nardò, Ayine moved to Italian amateur club Ellera Calcio in January 2020. In June 2020, he joined Pirin Blagoevgrad.

Honours 
Thonon Evian

 Championnat National 3: 2021–22

References

External links
Profile at Foot National 

1991 births
Living people
French footballers
French sportspeople of Beninese descent
Black French sportspeople
Footballers from Rouen
Association football forwards
En Avant Guingamp players
Paris Saint-Germain F.C. players
US Quevilly-Rouen Métropole players
Córdoba CF players
Écija Balompié players
Racing de Santander players
Getafe CF B players
Rochdale A.F.C. players
Newport County A.F.C. players
Virtus Francavilla Calcio players
A.S. Bisceglie Calcio 1913 players
S.S. Fidelis Andria 1928 players
U.S. Savoia 1908 players
OFC Pirin Blagoevgrad players
Thonon Evian Grand Genève F.C. players
Segunda División players
Segunda División B players
Championnat National players
Championnat National 2 players
Championnat National 3 players
Serie C players
Serie D players
Second Professional Football League (Bulgaria) players
French expatriate footballers
French expatriate sportspeople in Spain
French expatriate sportspeople in England
French expatriate sportspeople in Italy
French expatriate sportspeople in Bulgaria
Expatriate footballers in Spain
Expatriate footballers in England
Expatriate footballers in Italy
Expatriate footballers in Bulgaria